Adrian Lock is an English field hockey coach of the Spanish women's national team.

He coached the team at the 2018 Women's Hockey World Cup.

References

Living people
English field hockey coaches
English expatriate sportspeople in Spain
Year of birth missing (living people)
Spanish Olympic coaches